Mautino State Fish and Wildlife Area is an Illinois state park on  in Bureau County, Illinois, United States.

References

State parks of Illinois
Protected areas of Bureau County, Illinois